is an Irish male name meaning [ruling with] "fervour over the people" or "valour of the tribe", from Old Irish túath "people, tribe, tribal territory" + gal "ardour, valour", from Proto-Celtic *galā "might, ability".

 is also the Modern Irish for movement anticlockwise or widdershins, from the Old Irish túath “left, north” + sel “turn”, from a different Proto-Celtic root not meaning "people, tribe", see there, sense 2 for details.

People with the name include:
 Túathal Techtmar, legendary king
 Túathal Máelgarb (fl. 6th century), king of Tara
 Túathal mac Máele-Brigte (died 854), king of Leinster
 Tuathal Mac Augaire (died 958), king of Leinster
 Túathal (bishop of the Scots) (fl. 1050s), bishop of Cennrígmonaid, modern St Andrews
 Tuathal Ua Connachtaig (fl. 12th century) Irish bishop of Kells or Breifne

One instance is the O'Toole family prominent in medieval Wicklow, who claimed descent from Tuathal Mac Augaire.

Placenames associated with the name include:
 Listowel  "Túathal's ringfort", a town in County Kerry
 Carrauntoohil  "Túathal's sickle", a mountain in County Kerry
 Glasthule  "Túathal's stream", a suburb of Dublin

See also
 Túathalán (died 749), abbot of Cennrígmonaid, modern St Andrews

Irish-language masculine given names